Harunur Rashid is a Bangladesh Nationalist Party politician and the former Member of Parliament of Chandpur-4.

Early life
Rashid was born on 8 June 1957 in Faridganj Upazila, Chandpur District, East Pakistan, Pakistan.

Career
Rashid was elected to parliament from Chandpur-4 as a Bangladesh Nationalist Party candidate in 2009. He boycotted the 2018 general elections.

References

Bangladesh Nationalist Party politicians
1957 births
Living people
9th Jatiya Sangsad members